Clemente Pugliese Levi (1855 in Vercelli – 1936)  was an Italian painter, mainly of luminous alpine landscapes in his native Piedmont.

He was a resident of Turin. He was strongly influenced by Impressionism. He also painted numerous vedute, including Il Mercato del Pesce. Among his works are Il Mattino nuvoloso: Fieno maturo; and a Chestnut forest In the 1881 Exhibition at Turin, in 1881, he displayed: Un'occhiata ai lavori; in 1884 again in Turin, he exhibited: Sul mercato dei fiori a Porta Palazzo; La Dora and Uno studio dal vero. At the 1887 Mostra of Venice, he sent: Color del sole; Paesaggio; Fieno maturo and Mattino nuvoloso. In 1888, he displayed Per la festa del Mercato; Un giorno triste; and Un bosco.

References

1855 births
1936 deaths
Painters from Piedmont
Italian landscape painters
Jewish painters
19th-century Italian painters
Italian male painters
20th-century Italian painters
People from Vercelli
19th-century Italian male artists
20th-century Italian male artists